Babbie may refer to:

Babbie, Alabama, town in Covington County, Alabama, United States
Earl Babbie (born 1938), American sociologist 
Babbie, wooden cill protector in a canal lock; see Lock (water transport)